Elia Nuqul is a Palestinian businessperson. He is the founder of the Nuqul Group, a business conglomerate with 31 companies, including Fine Hygienic Holding. 

Nuqul grew up in Ramla with an ambition of being an engineer. His father was a greengrocer and his mother sold embroidery from their home. He began his studies at the American University of Beirut before his family was expelled from the country. Nugul is a Christian-Palestinian and his family was forced to leave during the creation of Israel in 1948. 

In 1952, Nuqul founded the Nuqul Group under the name Nuqul Brothers. It started off by trading and importing food and consumer goods. Nuqul included "Brothers" in the name with expectations that it would eventually become a family business. In the late 1950s, the company started producing hygienic paper products. In 1958, Nuqul founded Fine, a tissue and paper product manufacturer, and is considered the first Arab to bring such industry into that region. By 2009, the Nuqul Group included 31 companies and over 5,500 employees. 

The Elia Nuqul Foundation was formed in 2008. The Foundation provides education to people in underprivileged areas. The idea for the Foundation was from Nuqul's time in Ramla when he was unable to complete his education due to financial conditions and his refugee status.

References 

Living people

Year of birth missing (living people)
Palestinian Christians
Palestinian businesspeople